Craig Greenberg (born August 22, 1973) is an American businessman, lawyer, and politician serving as the third mayor of Louisville Metro. During his mayoral campaign, he was the subject of what has been termed an assassination attempt at his campaign headquarters, but emerged unscathed.

After graduating from Harvard Law School, Greenberg was a lawyer at Frost Brown Todd in Louisville. He was then a co-founder, president, and chief executive officer of 21c Museum Hotels. In January 2021, Greenberg and Matt Jones, a sports radio host, purchased Ohio Valley Wrestling.

Early life and career
Greenberg was born in Commack, New York. His family moved to Louisville, Kentucky, in 1980. He graduated from Ballard High School. He earned his Bachelor of Science from the University of Michigan in 1995, where he was president of the student government, and his Juris Doctor from Harvard Law School in 1998.

Greenberg began his law career at Frost Brown Todd in Louisville. As an attorney with the firm, he worked on its ancillary business initiatives.

In 2006, Greenberg met art collectors and investors Steve Wilson and Laura Lee Brown, and with them co-founded the 21c Museum Hotels chain. He was named the company's president in 2012 and chief executive officer in 2017. He stepped down from 21c Museum Hotels in June 2020.

In January 2021, Greenberg and Matt Jones, a sports radio host, purchased Ohio Valley Wrestling. Greenberg was also involved in the development of Louisville Museum Plaza and Whiskey Row, and served as a trustee for the University of Louisville.

Mayor of Louisville

Campaign
In April 2021, Greenberg announced his candidacy for mayor of Louisville in the 2022 election, seeking to succeed Greg Fischer, who could not run for reelection due to term limits. He ran on a platform of public safety, affordable housing, universal pre-K, cracking down on illegal guns, supporting abortion rights, and cleaning up the city.

Attempted murder of Greenberg
On February 14, 2022, Quintez Brown, a 21-year-old social justice activist and prominent voice in the Black Lives Matter community who was running as an independent for Louisville's Metro Council, walked into Greenberg's campaign headquarters office near downtown Louisville and allegedly fired several shots from a 9mm Glock semi-automatic pistol at Greenberg from the doorway. A bullet passed through Greenberg's shirt and sweater but did not injure him. Brown then fled, as a member of the office staff was able to slam its door closed and the staff barricaded the door with tables and desks. Brown was soon arrested less than half a mile away, carrying a 9 mm handgun and loaded 9mm magazines, and was charged with several crimes, including attempted murder. Louisville Metro Council President David James called the incident an "attempted assassination". Senate Minority Leader Mitch McConnell characterized the shooting as “what appears to be an assassination attempt against a Jewish mayoral candidate".

The next day, Black Lives Matter Louisville, a chapter of the Black Lives Matter Global Network Foundation, and the Louisville Community Bail Fund jointly posted bail of $100,000 for Brown. Greenberg said he was "traumatized" by Brown's release, adding, "it is nearly impossible to believe that someone can attempt murder on Monday and walk out of jail on Wednesday." His outrage was echoed from both sides of the political aisle; McConnell called it "jaw-dropping" and Democratic U.S. Senate candidate Charles Booker agreed that Brown should have remained incarcerated.

Brown was later rearrested on new federal charges, held as a federal prisoner at the Grayson County Detention Center in Leitchfield, Kentucky, and ordered to remain in custody ahead of trial. In March 2022, a grand jury indicted him on state charges of one count of attempted murder and four counts of first-degree wanton endangerment.

Election
Greenberg won the Democratic primary election in a field of eight candidates in May, finishing 20 percentage points ahead of the second-place finisher. In the November 8 general election, he defeated the Republican nominee, Bill Dieruf, by five percentage points, becoming mayor-elect of Louisville.

Personal life
Greenberg met his wife, Rachel, in Boston. She works as a public school teacher and they have two children. Greenberg is Jewish.

See also
List of people who survived assassination attempts

References

1973 births
American chief executives
Ballard High School (Louisville, Kentucky) alumni
Businesspeople from Louisville, Kentucky
Harvard Law School alumni
Jewish American people in Kentucky politics
Jewish mayors of places in the United States
Kentucky Democrats
Lawyers from Louisville, Kentucky
Living people
Mayors of Louisville, Kentucky
People from Commack, New York
People from Louisville, Kentucky
University of Michigan alumni